102.9 Triple M Newcastle (call sign: 2KKO) is an Australian radio station, licensed to, and serving Newcastle and surrounds. It broadcasts at 102.9 megahertz on the FM band from its studios in Newcastle. It is owned by Southern Cross Austereo and Its sister station is hit106.9.

History
The station commenced operations on 1 August 1931 as 2KO, based in the Newcastle suburb of KOtara, hence the call-sign. Founded by Allen Fairhall 2KO was licensed to The Newcastle Broadcasting Company. The station operated on 1415 kHz with a transmission strength of 25 watts. The station launched from the backyard of a resident's home, with the licensee's dining room being the only studio the station had at the time. Programs ran from 7 to 10 p.m., later moving into daytime programming. Ten minutes of ad time was sold during the week, selling around 15 pounds ($30 today) of revenue for the station. Chief Engineer was K. N. Greenhalgh AMIRE. Studio & Production Manager was 2KO Chief Announcer Harold Pickhover. Advertising & Merchandising Manager was Keith F. Winser F.O.A.

Two years later in 1933, the station moved its AM transmitter to Sandgate, and was operated from several locations including 72 Hunter Street, Newcastle until January 1937, when new studios and offices in the heart of Newcastle in the CML Building at 110 Hunter Street. In its time on the AM band, the station had its power increased twice, first to 2,000 watts, and then to 5,000 watts, using a directional aerial system.

In the days before television, peak listening time was around 8pm, but with television arriving in the country in the late 1950s, the station had to change formats to survive the new medium. This was even more the case when 2KO's owners at the time, United Broadcasting Company (who also owned Sydney's 2UE), itself owned by the local Lamb family, was part of the consortium that brought television to Newcastle, launching NBN Television on channel 3 in 1962.

These changes led to 2KO becoming a Top 40 music radio station. This took the audience by storm, and helped re-established radio as the personal medium.

Until 1978 there was a 10 kHz gap between radio stations.  However, the Geneva Frequency Plan of 1975 changed this to a 9 kHz gap, thus allowing more stations on the AM band. Therefore, on 23 November 1978, most Australian stations changed their frequencies and 2K0 went from 1410 kHz to 1413 kHz.

In May 1988, 2KO moved to facilities at 252 Pacific Highway, Charlestown.
KOFM / NXFM use MAESTRO for music play out & Automation after network programs until live assist.

On 12 October 1992, 2KO converted to the FM band, changing its callsign to 2KKO, and branding itself as KOFM 102.9. Four years later, on 22 January 1996, the parent company of KOFM (and of NXFM), Radio Newcastle Pty. Ltd., was purchased by Austereo. A few more years later, Austereo sold 50% to RG Capital Radio Network, whose stake in the station then transferred in 2004 to Macquarie Regional RadioWorks, upon the purchase of RG Capital's stations. In April 2011 Southern Cross Media bought out Austereo for $714 million giving Southern Cross Media full ownership of KOFM.

In late June 2017, the station again moved but this time to state of the art facilities in 18 Honeysuckle Drive.

On 9 November 2018, KOFM was renamed to 102.9 Triple M Newcastle.

Presenters

On air line-up
Monday-Friday

 Tanya & Steve 6:00am–9:00am
 JR 9:00am–1:00pm
 Blanchy 1:00pm–3:00pm
 The Marty Sheargold Show 3:00pm–4:00pm
 The Rush Hour with Gus, Jude & Wendell 4:00pm–6:00pm
 Tanya & Steve Catchup 6:00pm–7:00pm
 Nights with Dave Gleeson 7:00pm–10:00pm
 Triple M Aussie with Matty O 10:00pm–Midnight
 Night Shift with Luke Bona Midnight–5:30am
 Triple M NRL (March–October)

Weekends
 Weekend Agenda with Nicky and Franky 6:00am–9:00am (Saturday)
 Triple M NRL (March–October)
 All Newcastle Knights games
 Weekend announcers and panel operators include John Piva, Daniel Dimmock, Mark Sales and Nicky Ainley.
 The Range with Lee Kernaghan 7:00am–9:00am (Sunday)
 The Great Australian Doorstep with Spida & Sheree Everitt 6:00am–7:00am (Sunday)
 Moonman across Australia 10:00am–Midday (Sunday)
 Triple M Aussie with Matty O 10:00pm–Midnight (Saturday & Sunday)

News
 News Director: David Dollin
 News Presenters: Dan Flegg, Hannah Sly, Madeline Larson, Hamish Finlay

Rugby League coverage
Following Broadcast Operations Group's decision not to carry the Continuous Call Team from 2GB in Sydney, and therefore, ruling that rival 2HD could not carry Newcastle Knights games, KOFM picked up the program (and rights to Knights games), beginning 2006. KOFM also poached long time 2HD commentator Gary Harley to continue his role as commentator on Knights games until dismissal early 2014. Triple M no longer carries 2GB's coverage anymore due to Triple M Sydney's successful bid for NRL broadcast rights (but will broadcast Knights games with local content).

References

Radio stations in Newcastle, New South Wales
Southern Cross Media Group
Radio stations established in 1931
Adult contemporary radio stations in Australia